Lyallpur Town is a municipal administration area in Faisalabad city, Pakistan.

References

Tehsil municipal administrations of Faisalabad
Metropolitan areas of Pakistan